The Voice of Free China was the international broadcasting station of the Republic of China from 1949 until 1998. During the Cold War era the station was the source of Chinese Nationalist propaganda largely aimed at discrediting the People's Republic of China and buttressing the Nationalists' claims to be the sole legitimate government of all of China.

The Voice of Free China, for many years, was owned by the Broadcasting Corporation of China. This was a private company under a government contract to provide public radio programming. The BCC still exists today, but in 1998 the Voice of Free China and the government-owned Central Broadcasting System merged.

With the easing of cross-strait relations and the liberalization of Taiwan's government, the Voice of Free China changed its name to Radio Taipei International in 1998 and also used the name "Voice of Asia" for some broadcasts. In 2003, it became Radio Taiwan International reflecting the defeat of the Kuomintang government in 2000 and the new government's orientation towards Taiwan independence from China. Today, this station is now known as Radio Taiwan International.

See also
Propaganda in the Republic of China

Radio stations in Taiwan
International broadcasters
Kuomintang
Radio stations established in 1949
Radio stations disestablished in 1998
1949 establishments in Taiwan
1998 disestablishments in Taiwan
Defunct mass media in Taiwan
Former state media
Propaganda in Taiwan